John Bruce "Chip" Saltsman Jr.  (born March 24, 1968) is an American politician who has served as chairman of the Tennessee Republican Party from 1999 to 2001, senior political advisor to former Senate Majority Leader Bill Frist, and manager of Mike Huckabee's 2008 presidential campaign. He also worked for the Chuck Fleischmann campaign in Tennessee's 3rd district from 2009 to 2010. Saltsman also worked for Randy Boyd's unsuccessful Tennessee Gubernatorial campaign in 2018.

Early life
Saltsman was born in Nashville, Tennessee, to parents Bruce Saltsman and Edna Elaine Saltsman. He attended Father Ryan High School, a Catholic high school in Nashville, and then Christian Brothers University in Memphis, where he earned his bachelor's and master's in business administration degrees.  While at Christian Brothers, Saltsman was active in the Sigma Alpha Epsilon fraternity, the Knights of Columbus and student government.

Political career
Under Saltsman's watch as state party chairman in 2000, then-Governor George W. Bush defeated then-Vice President Al Gore in his home state of Tennessee.

Work with Frist
Saltsman followed this accomplishment by working as Development Director for Senator Frist at the National Republican Senatorial Committee in the 2002, where he helped Republicans regain control of the Senate after the defection of Senator James Jeffords handed the chamber to Democratic control in May 2001.

Saltsman then became Senior Political Advisor to Majority Leader Frist at VOLPAC, a political action committee chaired by Frist and dedicated to recruitment and support of Republican candidates for political office nationwide.  In 2004, eighteen of the twenty-two races that VOLPAC supported were successful.  And, in 2006, VOLPAC helped ensure the election of Senator Bob Corker over Harold Ford, Jr. in Tennessee.

Saltsman was also an important figure in Senator Frist's preparations for a potential run for the Republican presidential nomination in 2008 and was labeled "Frist's secret weapon" by Chris Cillizza of The Washington Post  and "a multi-talented superstar ... [who has] demonstrated uncanny, remarkable leadership in every endeavor he's undertaken" by Frist himself.

Huckabee presidential campaign

Saltsman was nominated by Marc Ambinder of The Atlantic as one of the top four campaign managers of the election cycle, and has since been labeled a "noted GOP strategist" with "a strong future on the national campaign-management stage."

RNC Chair candidacy

Saltsman announced his candidacy for RNC Chairman, after frequent mentions prior to announcing.

In his bid for the RNC Chairmanship, Saltsman was endorsed by: former Republican presidential candidate Governor Mike Huckabee, former United States Senate Majority Leader Bill Frist, Tennessee Lt. Governor Ron Ramsey, and Tennessee House Majority Leader Jason Mumpower.

Saltsman dropped out one day before the voting following a controversy regarding Saltsman's distribution of a CD containing the song 'Barack the Magic Negro".

Fleischmann Congressional campaign
After incumbent U.S. Representative Zach Wamp decided to leave Congress to run for Governor of Tennessee, Saltsman became campaign manager for Chuck Fleischmann, an attorney and former talk radio host who sought the Republican nomination to succeed Wamp in the third congressional district seat. Mike Huckabee endorsed Fleischmann in March 2010. Fleischmann's biggest competition in the Republican primary was expected to come from former state GOP chairwoman Robin Smith. The U.S. House Republican whip Eric Cantor, chief deputy whip Representative Kevin McCarthy, the House Republican Conference chairman Mike Pence and Newt Gingrich had endorsed Smith. Fleischmann won the August 5, 2010, primary, topping a field of 11 candidates with about 30% of the vote and edging out second-place finisher Robin Smith, who earned 28%.

In March 2010, Saltsman was also hired as top gubernatorial campaign consultant for South Carolina  Lieutenant Gov. André Bauer. Bauer came in fourth among four candidates in the GOP primary in June 2010.

Randy Boyd Gubernatorial Campaign 
Randy Boyd, who was previously the Commissioner of the Tennessee Department of Economic and Community Development, announced in March 2017 that he would be running for Governor in the 2018 election.   Boyd tapped Saltsman to serve as the Campaign CEO.

Former Congresswoman Diane Black and Boyd as recently as June 2018 were considered to be the frontrunners to win the Republican primary. Bill Lee ended up winning the primary with 37% of the vote, followed by Boyd at 24% and Black at 23%, despite Boyd being the biggest spender in the Governor’s race. Black was second in spending.

Rusty Crowe Congressional campaign 
Dr. Phil Roe decided not to seek reelection in Tennessee’s First Congressional District, setting up an open primary in 2020. State Senator Rusty Crowe (R-Johnson City), was considered an early favorite, having been a State Senator nearly 30 years. Crowe led by 10% in a January poll conducted by Spry Strategies. Crowe hired Saltsman in June 2020 for his congressional campaign.

Despite starting out with a lead in the polls and being one of the leading spenders in the race, Crowe finished in third place.

Crowe’s lost represents the second consecutive primary contest where Saltsman’s candidate lost.

Matt Hullander Hamilton County Mayoral campaign 
Saltsman served as a consultant for Matt Hullander’s 2022 Hamilton County Mayoral campaign. Despite, being the largest spender in the Republican primary, Hullander came in third place in the Republican primary.

Baxter Lee Congressional campaign 
After redistricting, Tennessee’s 5th Congressional District became a Republican friendly district – and a prime pickup opportunity. The new 5th Congressional District attracted many Republican candidates for the primary. Saltsman was named campaign manager for Baxter Lee, a Nashville businessman, was kicked off the ballot for not being a bonafide Republican.

Lee’s failed congressional campaign represents the fourth consecutive major Tennessee Republican primary where Saltsman’s candidate lost.

Tennessee Fish and Wildlife Commission
Saltsman was appointed by House Speaker Cameron Sexton to join the Tennessee Fish and Wildlife Commission in July 2022.

References

External links
 RNC Chairman campaign website
 Chuck Fleischmann campaign website
 

1968 births
Christian Brothers University alumni
Living people
People from Nashville, Tennessee
State political party chairs of Tennessee
Tennessee Republicans